Chang Jiang: The Great River of China is a 1999 IMAX film documenting the course and people of the Yangtze. It was Chinese/Japanese-produced and runs 40 minutes.

References

1999 films
1999 documentary films
IMAX short films
Films set in China
1999 short films
Films shot in China

IMAX documentary films